The 2020 elections for the Florida Senate took place on Tuesday, November 3, 2020 to elect state senators from 20 of 40 districts. The Republican Party has held a Senate majority since 1995. The result was a one seat gain for the Republicans, thus maintaining their majority.

The elections for U.S. President, U.S. House of Representatives, and the Florida House of Representatives were also held on this date.

Republican operatives, supported by Florida Power & Light, ran sham ghost candidates in three races. In District 37, former senator Frank Artiles had Alex Rodriguez placed on the ballot to successfully siphon votes from Senator José Javier Rodríguez. Both Artiles and Alex Rodriguez were charged and fined for electoral fraud.

Competitive races

The most competitive races are expected to be the Democratic-held open Senate District 3 in North Florida, the Republican-held open District 9 to the northeast of Orlando, the special election in the Tampa area's open Republican-held District 20, the Democratic-held Senate District 37 in South Florida, and the Republican-held open District 39 in South Florida.

2016 Presidential Results and 2020 Candidates in Competitive Races:

Overview

Closest races 
Seats where the margin of victory was under 10%:
  gain

Predictions

Primary election polling

District 27 - Republican

District 29 - Democratic

District 39 - Democratic

Retiring incumbents

Democrats
 3rd district: Bill Montford (term-limited)
 29th district: Kevin Rader (retiring)
 35th district: Oscar Braynon (term-limited)

Republicans
 5th district: Rob Bradley (term-limited)
 9th district: David H. Simmons (term-limited)
 21st district: Bill Galvano (term-limited)
 27th district: Lizbeth Benacquisto (term-limited)
 39th district: Anitere Flores (term-limited)

General election polling

District 3

District 9

District 20

District 37

District 39

Results

District 1

District 3

District 5

District 7

District 9

District 11

District 13

District 15

District 17

District 19

District 20

District 21

District 23

District 25

District 27

District 29

District 31

District 35

District 37

District 39

Notes

Partisan clients

See also
 2020 Florida elections
 2020 Florida House of Representatives election
 Politics of Florida
 Political party strength in Florida
 Florida Democratic Party
 Republican Party of Florida
 Government of Florida

References

External links 
 Florida Elections Commission government website
  (State affiliate of the U.S. League of Women Voters)
 
 
 
 

Senate
Florida Senate
Florida Senate elections